P. plicata  may refer to:
 Plicisyrinx plicata, a sea snail species
 Psoralea plicata, a herb species found in Pakistan
 Psychotria plicata, a plant species endemic to Jamaica
 Purshia plicata, the antelope bush, a plant species found in Mexico

See also
 Plicata (disambiguation)